Joseph Vikram Harris (born 16 August 1965) is an Indian-born Canadian cricketer. He is a right-handed batsman and a right-hand offbreak bowler.

Having played cricket since the mid-eighties, including a handful of matches for Barbados he became the leader of the Canadian cricket team in 2003, captaining them into the 2003 Cricket World Cup. He made himself a renowned name for the Canadian team in the Toronto Leagues, leading them to victory in the first Americas Cup. He originally planned to retire after the World Cup, but was lured back for the 2004 ICC 6 Nations Challenge owing to the absence of John Davison. Canada lost all their games in that tournament, and Harris has not played since. Harris has a daughter, Erika.

References
 

1965 births
Barbados cricketers
Canadian cricketers
Canadian cricket captains
Canada One Day International cricketers
Cricketers at the 1998 Commonwealth Games
Indian emigrants to Canada
Living people
Anglo-Indian people
Canadian people of Anglo-Indian descent
Cricketers from Chennai
Canadian sportspeople of Indian descent
Commonwealth Games competitors for Canada